Borivoje "Bora" Cenić (25 September 1930 – 13 January 2021) was a Serbian professional basketball coach and player.

Career achievements 
 Yugoslav Women's League champion: 4 (with Radnički Belgrade: 1964, 1965, 1966, 1968)
 Slobodan Piva Ivković Award for Lifetime Achievement (2002)

References

1930 births
2021 deaths
Apollon Patras B.C. coaches
Basketball players from Belgrade
OKK Beograd coaches
KK Jagodina coaches
BKK Radnički coaches
BKK Radnički players
KK BASK players
KK Železničar Beograd players
Serbian men's basketball coaches
Serbian men's basketball players
Serbian expatriate basketball people in Greece
Serbian expatriate basketball people in Kuwait
Yugoslav basketball coaches
Yugoslav men's basketball players